is a Japanese politician for the Liberal Democratic Party (LDP) and the leader of the LDP Shisuikai faction (informally called the Nikai faction), who served as the Secretary-General of the LDP from 2016 to 2021. He was previously the Minister of Economy, Trade and Industry. Nikai is currently serving in his eighth term in the Lower House representing Wakayama's Third District. He is widely considered to be "Japan's most pro-China lawmaker". He has also been criticized for misogynistic views expressed in the past, and caused controversy when he invited women to "look, but not talk" at key party meetings.

On October 31, 2021, he was elected for the thirteenth time in Japan's 49th general election to the House of Representatives. At the age of 82 years and 8 months, he was the oldest winner in the election.

Early life
Nikai was born in Gobō, Wakayama Prefecture. His father was an assemblyman in the Wakayama Prefectural Assembly who had little time for his son; his mother Kikue was the daughter of a physician and, unusual for that time for a woman in Japan, was a physician herself. He initially attended Inahara Elementary School, but at the end of WWII, he transferred to Gobō Elementary School. While attending Gobō Middle School, he participated in an extracurricular debating society, where he addressed the human rights issues facing the Burakumin, citing The Broken Commandment, a novel by Tōson Shimazaki. After graduation from Wakayama Prefectural Hidaka High School, Nikai attended Chuo University in Tokyo, graduating with a law degree in 1961. He immediately entered politics, working as secretary for Saburo Endo, a Diet member from Shizuoka who was serving as the Minister of Construction.

First election successes
After Endo's death, Nikai returned to Wakayama, where he won a seat on the Wakayama Prefectural Assembly in 1975. He was elected to the House of Representatives in 1983. He was a member of Noboru Takeshita's faction within the Liberal Democratic Party, but left the party in 1993 to join the Japan Renewal Party (Shinseitō). As a member of the JRP, he served as Vice-Minister of Transportation under Morihiro Hosokawa in 1990.

Party membership
He was later a member of the Liberal Party, Conservative Party, and New Conservative Party, independent parties in coalition with the LDP. As Secretary-General of the NCP and part of the governing coalition, he served as Minister of Transportation under Keizō Obuchi and Yoshirō Mori. After the NCP merged with the LDP in 2003, Nikai became an LDP member again, and was appointed Director of the General Affairs Bureau in 2004.

Member of Koizumi Cabinet
In 2005, Prime Minister Junichiro Koizumi tapped Nikai to head the Diet committee in charge of the privatization of Japan Post. Following the general elections of that year, on 31 October, Koizumi selected Nikai to head the Ministry of Economy, Trade and Industry, traditionally one of the most highly valued cabinet portfolios.

LDP senior politician
Later, under Prime Minister Yasuo Fukuda, Nikai was returned to the post of Minister of Economy, Trade and Industry on 1 August 2008. Nikai is known to have strong ties with Chinese leaders and accompanied relief supplies to Sichuan after the earthquake there in June 2008. In the Cabinet of Prime Minister Taro Aso, appointed on 24 September 2008, Nikai was retained as Minister of Economy, Trade and Industry.

Nikai was appointed LDP Secretary General by party president Shinzo Abe in August 2016. Following Abe's resignation in September 2020, the new party president Yoshihide Suga decided to retain Nikai in this role.

Remarks 
Tetsuma Esaki, a former Minister of State for Okinawa and Northern Territories Affairs is known as the second side of Nikai. Because, Nikai was a second side of Masumi Esaki, the father of Tetsuma.

Kakuei Tanaka, a former Prime Minister and Shin Kanemaru, a former Deputy Prime Minister of Japan both have the coined title of "Master of Nikai".

References

Chuo University alumni
Ministers of Transport of Japan
Living people
1939 births
Members of the Wakayama Prefectural Assembly
Liberal Democratic Party (Japan) politicians
Japan Renewal Party politicians
Liberal Party (Japan, 1998) politicians
New Conservative Party (Japan) politicians
21st-century Japanese politicians
Government ministers of Japan
People from Gobō, Wakayama